Charnizay is a commune in the Indre-et-Loire department in central France.

History
In 1794, Charnizay annexed the commune of Saint Michel des Landes.

Population

Sights
 Dolmen le Palet de Gargantua , near the hamlet of Les Champs de l'Ormeau

Personalities
Charles de Menou d'Aulnay (1604–1650), named governor of Acadia in 1638.

See also
Communes of the Indre-et-Loire department

References

Communes of Indre-et-Loire